Zhang Jiayi (Chinese: 张嘉益; born 8 April 1970) is a Chinese actor. He played his first role in 1990, then graduated from Beijing Film Academy in 1991.

From 1990 to 2019, Zhang Jiayi has participated in around 90 television series, 35 films and 1 animation producing, Zhang has had over 20 awards and nominations so far. In the television series Dwelling Narrowness, Zhang played the leading role Song Siming. This TV series gained extensive social attention and discussion after its broadcast in 2009, then Zhang Jiayi rose to fame.

Early life and education
Zhang Jiayi was born and raised in Xi'an, Shaanxi, China. Zhang was a student with merit on wrestle when he was in high school. After graduated from high school, he planned to be a professional wrestler. However, with the advice of his uncle who worked in Xi'an Film Studio, he decided to take the admission test of Beijing Film Academy. As a student who never had professional performance class before, Zhang did not hold any hope on being admitted, but he was admitted to Beijing Film Academy with his talent. After graduating from Beijing Film Academy, he was assigned to Xi'an Film Studio.

Career 
Zhang played his first role as Kang bosi in film Rubilks-clock in 1990, which is his first film. One year later, he graduated from Beijing Film Academy and changed his name from Zhang Xiaotong to Zhang Jiayi.

In 1995, Zhang played Zhang Jianguo in television series Daobei People which is his first time to appear in small screen.

Zhang in 1999 participated in film Xian's Finest and won Society Award at 7th Golden Phoenix Awards.

Zhang came back to Beijing from Xi'an in 2000. And he played Wu Dengyun in television series Dr. Wu in Pamir which was adapted from a true story and won the First Prize of television series at 21st Flying Apsaras Awards.

In 2004, Zhang played main role Song Chao in television series National Mission cooperated with actress Wang Haiyan.

Zhang gained attention and popularity and rose to fame with his role as Song Siming in television series Dwelling Narrowness in 2009.

Zhang won the Best Actor(Contemporary Drama) at 4th Huading Awards in 2010 due to television series I Am the Proprietor.

In 2011, Zhang won the Best Actor at 17th  Magnolia Awards for his performing in television drama Borrow Gun. In hit film Love Is Not Blind, Zhang played as a supporting role.

In 2012, Zhang participated in television drama The Brink as main actor and artistic director. In May, he played as Liu Chenxi in hit television drama Angel Heart which was adapted from writer Liu Liu's novel. In September, he played as a police in television series Story of Police in Yingpan. Zhang won the Best Actor at 8th Huading Awards, 3rd Golden Lotus Awards and 4th China TV Drama Awards for his performing in The Brink. And he won the Best Actor at 29th Flying Apsaras Awards, 27th China TV Golden Eagle Award due to Story of Police in Yingpan. At 8th Huading Awards, he also won 10 Most Popular TV Celebrities of the year award.

Zhang played as main role in Life's Ups and Downs in 2013 and won the Best Actor at 19th Magnolia Awards. In the same year, he participated in film The Founding of a Party and won the Society Award at 14th Golden Phoenix Awards.

In 2014, Zhang played as main role in A Servant of Two Masters and won the Best Actor at 6th China TV Drama Awards. In Forty-nine Days Memorial, a television series which was adapted from writer Geling Yan's novel, Zhang Jiayi's performing won the Best Actor Award at 20th Asian Television Awards. Same year, Zhang participated in Chinese director Zhang Yimou's film Coming Home.

In 2015, Zhang participated in television series White Deer Plain as leading role and artistic director. He also played a guest role in hit drama Game of Hunting. At 1st China Quality Television Drama Ceremony, Zhang won the Most Expressive Actor award.In 2016, Zhang played as main actor in contemporary drama My! Physical Education Teacher. Same year, he participated in Chinese director Feng Xiaogang's film I Am Not Madame Bovary, and was nominated for the Best Actor at 8th China Film Director's Guild Awards.

The drama White Deer Plain was allowed to broadcast in 2017. Due to this television drama, Zhang was nominated for Best Actor at 8th Golden Lotus Awards and 29th China TV Golden Eagle Awards. And he won the Best Actor at 4th Asia Rainbow TV Awards. In this year, he also played a main role in television drama Wonderful Life, and won Best Actor at 24th Huading Awards in 2018 for his performing in this drama.

Personal life

Marriage 
In 2004, during filming the television series National Mission, Zhang had a romance with actress Wang Haiyan. Three years later, in 2007, Zhang married Wang in his hometown Xi'an. This is his second marriage. On September 19, 2010, their first daughter was born, and was named Zhang Yixin.

Disease 
In the beginning of 2018, a video about Zhang Jiayi in television series Wonderful Life went viral because of his unique walking posture. In fact, his unique walking posture is one of the symptoms of ankylosing spondylitis. The disease limits his actions so that sometimes he is unable to straighten his back. When he was 22, he felt the back pain, but did not pay much attention and still endured the pain to work, which made his illness more serious. According to his speech in CCTV program Voice, he was diagnosed with ankylosing spondylitis when he was 25.

Filmography

Television series

Film

Animation film

Awards and nominations

Forbes China Celebrity 100

References

External links 
 

1970 births
Living people
Male actors from Xi'an
Beijing Film Academy alumni
Chinese male television actors
Chinese male film actors